Abdikhani (also Romanized as ‘Abdīkhānī and ‘Abdī Khānī; also known as ‘Abdū Khānī) is a village in Dorunak Rural District, Zeydun District, Behbahan County, Khuzestan Province, Iran. At the 2006 census, its population was 255, in 61 families.

References 

Populated places in Behbahan County